Carlos Roberto Izquierdoz (born November 3, 1988) is an Argentine professional footballer who plays as a centre-back for Sporting Gijón.

Club career

Lanus 
Izquierdoz came through the Lanús youth levels.

Atlanta (loan) 
On 8 July 2009, Izquierdoz joined Atlanta on loan from Lanús.

Return to Lanús 
After his return from loan, Izquierdoz became a regular at Lanús, helping the club win the 2013 Copa Sudamericana.

Santos Laguna 
On 29 May 2014, Izquierdoz signed with Liga MX club Santos Laguna.

Boca Juniors 
On 5 July 2018, Izquierdoz joined Primera División club Boca Juniors.

Sporting Gijón 
On 28 July 2022, Izquierdoz joined Segunda División club Sporting Gijón, on a two-year contract.

Honours
Lanús
 Copa Sudamericana: 2013

Santos Laguna
 Liga MX: Clausura 2015, Clausura 2018
 Copa MX: Apertura 2014
 Campeón de Campeones: 2015

Boca Juniors
 Primera División: 2019–20, 2022
 Copa Argentina: 2019–20
 Copa de la Liga Profesional: 2020, 2022
 Supercopa Argentina: 2018

References

External links

1988 births
Living people
Argentine footballers
Association football central defenders
Argentine Primera División players
Liga MX players
Club Atlético Lanús footballers
Club Atlético Atlanta footballers
Boca Juniors footballers
Santos Laguna footballers
Argentine expatriate footballers
Expatriate footballers in Mexico
Argentine expatriate sportspeople in Mexico
Sportspeople from Bariloche
Sporting de Gijón players
Argentine expatriate sportspeople in Spain
Expatriate footballers in Spain